"Who'd She Coo?" was a hit song for The Ohio Players in 1976.  Released from their hit album Contradiction, it spent one week at #1 on the Hot Soul Singles chart and peaked at #18 on the Billboard Hot 100 singles chart in September, 1976. "Who'd She Coo" was the group's last chart-topping single as well as their last entry in the Top 40.

Chart positions

References

1976 songs
Ohio Players songs
1976 singles
Mercury Records singles